Arcoa is a genus of flowering plants in the family Fabaceae. It belongs to the subfamily Caesalpinioideae. Arcoa is monotypic, with the single species Arcoa gonavensis. It is endemic to Hispaniola.

References 

Caesalpinioideae
Fabaceae genera
Flora of the Dominican Republic
[[Category:Flora of Haiti]